The Fusobacteriales-1 RNA motif is a conserved RNA structure that was discovered by bioinformatics.
Fusobacteriales-1 motif RNAs are found in Fusobacteriales.

Most Fusobacteriales-1 RNAs are located upstream of genes homologous to the locus FSAG_00736, which encodes a hypothetical protein in Fusobacterium peridonticum.
However, some Fusobacteriales-1 RNAs are located upstream of genes that do not appear to be homologous to FSAG_00736.
Additionally 1 Fusobacteriales-1 RNAs is not found upstream of a protein-coding gene.
In view of this information, it is ambiguous whether Fusobacteriales-1 RNAs function as cis-regulatory elements or whether they operate in trans.

References

Non-coding RNA